Mugda Medical College & Hospital is a public medical school and a 500-bed healthcare facility in Dhaka. At first, the facility was built as a general hospital which was later turned into a full-fledged medical school. Its construction began in 2006. The hospital opened in July 2013, and started admitting patients in early 2014.

It is the fourth government medical college inside Dhaka metropolitan city. From the first month of 2016, it has started classes of regular MBBS course.

Principals

Hostel facilities 
As Mugda Medical College is newly established, it does not have a separate hostel building yet. But it has somehow managed some accommodation system for both male and female students. The boys' hostel is now on the 2nd  floor of the hospital building which was previously in the academic building. The girls' hostel is situated on the twelfth floor of the hospital building.

Female hostel 
There are two hostel units on the 12th floor. First year students are accommodated in four hall rooms each having seats for eight to ten students. Senior students are allotted to the cabins each having seats for two to three students with an attached bathroom and a marvellous view from the balcony. Every hostel unit has two kitchens for only students' use with a gas oven and basin. The hostel committee provides three times a day nutritious meals for the students. The girls' hostel students are all included in many committees for maintenance and development of the hostel such as : Meal committee, Fund committee, Electric facility committee, Sanitation committee, Kitchen maintenance committee, WiFi committee, Cultural committee etc. The hostel fee is completely free for the students.

Boys' hostel 
Boys hostel of Mugda Medical College is temporarily is situated on the second  floor of hospital building. It has all the facilities for the accommodation of seniors and juniors.

Library 
Mugda Medical College has a rich library on the third floor of the hospital building beside the anatomy department. It has all types of books for MBBS & BDS curriculum. Students can borrow any book from here and read them for academic purposes. Beside the library there is a well furnished reading room where students can study together and discuss their academic knowledge.

Batch names and student numbers

Gallery

See also
 List of medical colleges in Bangladesh
 National Institute of Advanced Nursing Education and Research

References

External links

Medical colleges in Bangladesh
Universities and colleges in Dhaka
Hospitals in Dhaka
Educational institutions established in 2015
2015 establishments in Bangladesh